was a Japanese politician who served as Governor of Tokyo from 1967 to 1979. He is one of the best known socialist figures in modern Japanese history.

Early life
Minobe was born in Tokyo. His father, Tatsukichi Minobe, was a noted constitutional scholar, while his mother Tamiko was the eldest daughter of mathematician, educator, and politician Dairoku Kikuchi.

He graduated from the law faculty of Tokyo Imperial University in 1927 and lectured in the agriculture faculty from 1929 to 1932. In 1935, he took a faculty position at Hosei University.

In 1945, Minobe became an editorial writer for the newspaper Mainichi Shimbun. He was chosen to head the Cabinet Statistics Office in 1946.

Governor of Tokyo
In 1967, Minobe ran as the Communist and Socialist candidate for Governor of Tokyo. He defeated his two rivals, Rikkyo University president Masatoshi Matsushita (nominee of the LDP and DSP) and Shibusawa Shipping head Ken'ichi Abe (nominee of Komeito).

Among his many policy achievements, he is best known for:

providing free health care for the elderly
enactment of pollution controls
converting streets in heavily trafficked areas to pedestrian-only use
allowing the construction of the Korean School in Tokyo and exempting its owner, Chongryon, from local taxation
ending government sponsorship to Korakuen Hall race tracks

In 1971, Minobe won re-election, defeating LDP candidate Akira Hatano. He was re-elected for a third term in 1975, with the backing of the Socialists, Communists, and Komeito. (His defeated rival, LDP candidate Shintarō Ishihara, later served as a cabinet minister and eventually won the Tokyo governorship in the 1999 election.)

Many of Minobe's policies toward Chongryon, the Zainichi Korean group affiliated with North Korea were later undone by Ishihara in the aftermath of the revelation of North Korean abductions of Japanese.

Later life
Minobe refused to run for a fourth term in 1979. He ran for the House of Councillors in 1980 and won a seat. He remained a member of the Diet until his death in 1984.

References

1904 births
1984 deaths
Governors of Tokyo
Japanese socialists
University of Tokyo alumni
Academic staff of Hosei University